The 1998 Women's Rugby World Cup Final was a rugby union match to determine the winner of the 1998 Women's Rugby World Cup. The match took place on 16 May 1998 in Amsterdam and was between New Zealand and the United States. New Zealand beat the United States 44–12 to claim their first World Cup title.

Route to the final 

New Zealand was pooled with Scotland, Italy and World Cup debutantes, Germany. The United States were pooled with Spain, who missed the 1994 World Cup, along with Wales and Russia. New Zealand thrashed Germany 134–6 to record their first 100 points in a World Cup. They kept Scotland scoreless with 76–0 in their last pool game. The Black Ferns met Spain in their quarterfinal, they won 46–3 and went on to beat 1994 Champions, England, 44–11 to book their place in the Final.

The United States beat Russia in their first pool match 84–0, and then beat Spain 38–16. In their quarterfinal, they defeated Scotland in a closely contested match 25–10. Canada only managed 6 points against the United States 46 points in their semifinal game.

Match

Summary 
Vanessa Cootes scored four of the Black Ferns eight tries in the Final. Farah Palmer, Regina Sheck and Louisa Wall scored a try each with Annaleah Rush making two successful conversions to give New Zealand their first World Cup title.

Notes

References 

Final
New Zealand women's national rugby union team
United States women's national rugby union team
1998 in New Zealand rugby union
1998 in New Zealand women's sport
1998 in American rugby union
Women's rugby union matches
1998 in American women's sports
1998